Irena Martínková (born 19 September 1986) is a former Czech football midfielder who was a member of the Czech national team. For most of her career she has played for Sparta Prague in the Czech Women's First League and the Champions League. Irena is the older twin of Lucie Martínková, who is also a Czech footballer.

In 2013 and 2014 the Martínková sisters played for KIF Örebro DFF of the Swedish Damallsvenskan.

References

External links 

Svůdné sparťanky se fotily v plavkách. Vyzvou "ženskou Barcelonu" at iSport.cz
 
 
 

1986 births
Living people
Czech women's footballers
Czech Republic women's international footballers
Sportspeople from Kolín
Czech twins
Twin sportspeople
KIF Örebro DFF players
Expatriate women's footballers in Sweden
Damallsvenskan players
Czech expatriate women's footballers
Czech expatriate sportspeople in Sweden
Women's association football midfielders
AC Sparta Praha (women) players
Czech Women's First League players